TNF alpha induced protein 8 like 2 (TNFAIP8L2), also known as TIPE2, is a protein that in humans is encoded by the TNFAIP8L2 gene. It is preferentially expressed in human myeloid cell types and serves as an immune checkpoint regulator of inflammation and metabolism.

Function 

TNFAIP8L2 is a member of the TNFAIP8 (tumor necrosis factor-α-induced protein 8, or TIPE) family that function as transfer proteins for the second messenger lipids PIP2 and PIP3.  The other three family members are TNFAIP8, TNFAIP8L1 and TNFAIP8L3.

Structure 

The crystal structure of TIPE2 reveals that it contains a large, hydrophobic central cavity that is poised for cofactor binding.

Clinical significance 

TIPE2 acts as a negative regulator of the immune system.  It is down-regulated in patients with infectious and autoimmune diseases and also acts as a tumor suppressor in several types of cancer. Its knockout leads to leukocytosis and systemic inflammatory disorders in mice.

References